The Nagaland Pradesh Congress Committee (NPCC) is the unit of the Indian National Congress for the state of Nagaland, India.
Its head office is situated in Kohima, the capital city of Nagaland.

The present President of Nagaland Pradesh Congress Committee is Kewekhape Therie.

Nagaland Legislative Assembly election

See also
 Indian National Congress
 Congress Working Committee
 All India Congress Committee
 Pradesh Congress Committee

References

External links
 

Indian National Congress by state or union territory